Panchganchi was a village development committee in Jhapa District in the Province No. 1 of south-eastern Nepal. At the time of the 2011 Nepal census it had a population of 16600 people living in 2207 individual households. It was later merged with Satasidham, Dharampur, and Shivaganj to form the Shivasatakshi municipality.

References 

Populated places in Jhapa District